The 2019 Horizon League men's soccer tournament was the 32nd edition of the tournament. The tournament decided the Horizon League champion and guaranteed representative into the 2019 NCAA Division I men's soccer tournament.  The tournament began on November 11 and concluded on November 16, 2019.

Wright State won their first Horizon League championship, defeating Milwaukee 4–3 in penalty kicks after a 1–1 draw in regulation time and extra time. It was Wright State's first ever Horizon League tournament championship. Three-time defending champions, UIC, were eliminated in the semifinals by Milwaukee. Wright State second year head coach, Jake Slemker, won his first title with the Raiders.

Joel Sundell of Wright State won the Horizon League Tournament Most valuable player.

With the victory, Wright State earned the conference's automatic bid into the NCAA Tournament, which marked Wright State's first ever trip to the NCAA Tournament. In the opening round, Wright State upset Notre Dame 3–2 in the first round, before losing on penalty kicks to Michigan in the second round.

Seeds

Bracket

Results

First round

Semifinals

Final

Statistics

Goals

All-Tournament team 
Following the championship game, the Horizon League All-Tournament team was announced.

References

External links 
 2019 Horizon League Men's Soccer Championship Central

Horizon League Men's Soccer Tournament
Horizon League Men's Soccer
Horizon League Men's Socccer
Horizon League Men's Soccer
November 2019 sports events in the United States